Pseudostixis is a genus of longhorn beetles of the subfamily Lamiinae, containing the following species:

 Pseudostixis basigranosa Breuning, 1945
 Pseudostixis basilewskyi Breuning, 1960
 Pseudostixis densepunctata Breuning, 1936
 Pseudostixis dentata (Hintz, 1911)
 Pseudostixis flavifrons (Aurivillis, 1914)
 Pseudostixis flavomarmorata Breuning, 1964
 Pseudostixis griseostictica Breuning, 1936
 Pseudostixis integra Breuning
 Pseudostixis kivuensis Breuning, 1936
 Pseudostixis marshalli Breuning, 1936
 Pseudostixis proxima Breuning, 1936
 Pseudostixis vicina Breuning, 1936

References

Phrissomini